Layla Michelle Moran (born 12 September 1982) is a British Liberal Democrat politician serving as the Liberal Democrat Spokesperson for Foreign Affairs and International Development since 2020, and serving as the Member of Parliament for Oxford West and Abingdon since 2017.

Moran attended private schools in Brussels, Kingston in Jamaica and Roedean School near Brighton. She studied Physics at Imperial College London and completed her PGCE at Brunel University London. She worked as a maths and physics teacher. Moran unsuccessfully campaigned as the Liberal Democrat candidate in Battersea at the 2010 general election and in the West Central constituency at the 2012 London Assembly election.

She contested Oxford West and Abingdon at the 2015 general election, coming second. She was selected for the seat again at the 2017 general election and was elected to the House of Commons, defeating Conservative MP Nicola Blackwood, with 26,256 votes (43.7%) and a majority of 816.

She served as the Liberal Democrat spokesperson for the Department for Education under three leaders from 2017 to 2020, and was spokesperson for the Department for Digital, Culture, Media and Sport from 2019 to 2020.  After Jo Swinson lost her seat at the 2019 general election, Moran stood to become Leader of the Liberal Democrats in the 2020 leadership election, which she lost to Acting Leader Sir Ed Davey. On 31 August 2020, Davey appointed Moran as the Liberal Democrats' Shadow Foreign Secretary and as International Development Spokesperson the following day.

Moran came out as pansexual in 2020 and is believed to be the first UK parliamentarian to do so. She is the first MP of Palestinian descent.

Early life and career
Layla Michelle Moran was born in Hammersmith, London on 12 September 1982, the elder daughter of diplomat James Moran and Randa Moran, a Christian Palestinian from Jerusalem. Her great-grandfather was the Palestinian writer Wasif Jawhariyyeh, who published extensive memoirs. Moran describes herself as a British Palestinian. On her upbringing, Moran said "My Palestinian background has made me interested at a global level. Politics was always at the dinner table; it primed me to engage." Moran was raised as a cultural Christian and now identifies as a humanist.<ref>[https://hsld.org.uk/en/document/2020-party-leadership-election-interviews/layla-moran-the-party-leadership-election-interview.pdf HSLD 2020 Leadership Contest Interviews: Layla Moran MP – Interviewed, Wednesday 15th July 2020 by Toby Keynes, HSLD Chair. ] Retrieved 27 August 2020.</ref>

Because her father was a diplomat for the European Union and its predecessors, Moran grew up in various countries, including Belgium, Greece, Ethiopia, Jamaica and Jordan. She attended private schools in Brussels, Kingston in Jamaica and Roedean School in Brighton. From 2000 to 2003, she studied physics at Imperial College London, and from 2005 to 2007 completed a PGCE at Brunel University London. From 2007 to 2008, she studied for a master's degree in comparative education at UCL's Institute of Education.

From 2003 to 2012, Moran was a maths and physics teacher at the International School of Brussels, and at two schools in London: Queensmead School and Southbank International School. Between 2009 and 2013 she worked as a part-time course tutor for Oxford Study Courses, a company that helps International Baccalaureate teachers and students, and from 2013 she was full-time academic manager.

Political career
Moran was selected as the Liberal Democrat candidate for Battersea at the 2010 general election and came in third place. She also stood as a candidate for the West Central constituency in the 2012 London Assembly election, coming fourth.

Moran contested Oxford West and Abingdon at the 2015 general election, coming second. She was selected for the seat again at the 2017 general election and won the seat from Nicola Blackwood, a Conservative who was then a junior minister for health, with 26,256 votes (43.7%) and a majority of 816. Moran became the first UK Member of Parliament of Palestinian descent and the first female Liberal Democrat MP from an ethnic minority background.

In June 2017, Moran was named Liberal Democrat spokesperson for education, science and young people in the House of Commons. That month she used her maiden speech to call for fairer funding for schools, and in July 2017 she spoke out against the closure of all the Sure Start children's centres in Oxfordshire earlier in the year. Also in July 2017, Moran was jeered at for accusing the Conservatives of underfunding a new scheme to provide 30 hours of free child care for the children of working parents. Later in 2017, she was appointed a member of the Public Accounts Committee, which is responsible for overseeing government expenditure.

In May 2019, Moran announced that, being a relatively new MP, she would not be running in the 2019 Liberal Democrats leadership election. She had been considered a frontrunner to replace Vince Cable as leader, following his announcement in September 2018 that he intended to step down from the post. At the 2019 general election she stood for re-election, increasing her majority to 8,943. In March 2020, Moran announced that she would be running in the 2020 leadership election. Moran finished in second place with 35.6% of the vote, losing to Ed Davey, the acting co-leader.

Moran has also been a leading voice in the call for a full review of the GCSE history curriculum. She argues that to tackle institutional racism in society students must be taught of Britain's colonial past and the injustices that took place within it. In 2020 over 250,000 people signed a petition calling for 'Britain's colonial history to be made a compulsory part of the curriculum' which prompted Moran and 30 other cross-party MP's to apply greater pressure on the government to make significant changes to the history curriculum.

In 2021, Moran was one of three MPs who successfully took legal action against the Department of Health and Social Care over contracts awarded during the COVID-19 pandemic.

 Political positions 

 Climate change 
Moran supports action on climate change, and was the only Oxfordshire MP to support the Climate and Ecological Emergency Bill.

 European Union 
Moran opposed Brexit and supported a second referendum on EU membership. Despite her opposition to Brexit, after the 2019 general election, she said that a Liberal Democrat policy to cancel the departure without a second referendum was a mistake.

 Foreign policy 
Moran opposed the 2003 invasion of Iraq. She opposed cuts to foreign aid to Yemen. She is also critical of Saudi Arabian-led intervention in Yemen.

Moran believes that the United Kingdom should announce recognition of the State of Palestine. She called out the names of the children killed in the 2021 Israel–Palestine crisis in Parliament.

Moran supported an inquiry into the disappearances of Mohammed Bin Nayef and Prince Ahmed Bin Abdulaziz of Saudi Arabia. She is also critical of the arms-trade between Britain and Saudi Arabia, and is a critic of Russia. In February 2022, she used the cover of Parliamentary privilege to name the  Navalny 35, Russian oligarchs who, as allies of Vladimir Putin, should have sanctions imposed on them.

Moran is a supporter of Nazanin Zaghari-Ratcliffe and called for her release from prison in Iran.

Personal life
In an interview with The Times, Moran stated that she suffered from depression when she was a student and attributed it to a negative self-image resulting from the social stigma of obesity. She underwent stomach-stapling surgery to assist her in losing weight.

In 2013, Moran and her then boyfriend Richard Davis were briefly questioned by police, after she slapped him during an argument in their hotel room at the Liberal Democrat Federal Conference. No charge was brought, but the relationship subsequently ended.

On 2 January 2020, Moran revealed in an interview with PinkNews'' that she is pansexual; she is believed to be the first UK parliamentarian to come out as pansexual. Moran also disclosed that she was in a stable relationship with Rosy Cobb, formerly a Liberal Democrat press officer. Cobb was suspended by the party during the previous general election over an accusation that she had forged an email.

Electoral record

2019 UK general election

2017 UK general election

2015 UK general election

2012 London Assembly election

2010 UK general election

References

External links
 
 

1982 births
21st-century English women politicians
Alumni of Brunel University London
Alumni of Imperial College London
British humanists
English people of Palestinian descent
Female members of the Parliament of the United Kingdom for English constituencies
LGBT members of the Parliament of the United Kingdom
English LGBT politicians
Liberal Democrats (UK) MPs for English constituencies
Living people
Pansexual women
People educated at Roedean School, East Sussex
People from Hammersmith
UK MPs 2017–2019
UK MPs 2019–present